Charles Robert Hamilton Jr. (born January 8, 1978) is an American former professional stock car racing driver. He formerly competed in the NASCAR Nextel Cup Series, Nationwide Series, and Camping World Truck Series.

Early career
When he was 15 years old, he found a Ford Pinto in his driveway as a gift from his father (2004 NASCAR Craftsman Truck Series Champion Bobby Hamilton). They fixed up the car, and Hamilton began racing it on weekends at the local speedway. In 1998, he moved to the ARCA series where he earned four top-5 finishes in five races.

1998–2001
In 1998, Hamilton began to run some Busch Series races for the Sadler Brothers Racing No. 95 team. He made his debut at Rockingham in October, where he started in 27th position. He led four laps and finished 37th, three laps off the lead. He also made the race at Atlanta, had a 19th place start and 20th-place finish. Hamilton and the No. 95 Shoney's Inn team entered 1999 with a part-time schedule. In four races with the team, his best start was 6th at Daytona, and his best finishes were 27th at Rockingham and Darlington. He did not race again until the Hensley Motorsports No. 63 Exxon Superflo team had an opening. He ran six of the next seven races, beginning at Watkins Glen. In that seat, he set his best career finish of 21st at Pikes Peak. Hamilton then moved over to the No. 22 Air Jamaica Team owned by Carroll Racing. He qualified for all the races he attempted, and matched his career best start of sixth at Charlotte. At Homestead-Miami Hamilton started 15th and finished 9th.

Hamilton got a full-time ride with Carroll in 2000, driving the newly formed No. 26 Chevy, with sponsorship from Baywatch. Hamilton had three top-10s in 2000, with a fourth at Talladega, and a pair of sevenths at Charlotte and Memphis. Hamilton also won his first career pole in the season finale at Homestead-Miami. He finished 19th in points. During the Homestead weekend in 2000, he made his Winston Cup Series debut at that track, driving the No. 57 Chevrolet owned by his father. He finished 33rd in that race, six laps down. He drove the No. 01 Coors Light Chevrolet for SABCO Racing the following week to a 31st-place finish.

Hamilton returned to Carroll had a pair of fifth at Darlington and Rockingham in 2001. He also added three other Top 10s, and won another pole at Fontana in addition to starting in the Top 10 for half the races. After finishing 17th in points, he left the team. He made his Truck Series debut that year at The Milwaukee Mile in the No. 4 Dana Dodge Ram for BHR, but exited early due to a transmission failure. He also ran three races in the No. 33 Oakwood Homes Chevy for Andy Petree Racing as a teammate to his father, filling in for the injured Joe Nemechek. He also ran seven Cup races late in the season for Morgan-McClure Motorsports, driving the No. 4 Kodak Chevy to three Top 20 finishes.

2002–2006

In 2002, Hamilton joined Team Rensi Motorsports to drive the No. 25 United States Marine Corps-sponsored Ford Taurus. He won his first career race at New Hampshire and finished eighth in points. He also had his first Top 5 finish in the Truck Series at Nashville Superspeedway, finishing seventh in his father's Square D entry. He had his statistically career-best season in 2003, where he won four Busch Series races and finished fourth in the final standings. He also partnered with Rensi to run some races at the Winston Cup level, his best finish being a 14th at Kansas Speedway in the No. 35 Marines Ford.

Hamilton returned to Rensi in 2004, but did not win a race. He competed in six Nextel Cup events for Phoenix Racing in the No. 09 Miccosukee Indian Gambling-sponsored Dodge, and had a best finish of 17th. He also drove three times in the Truck Series, winning a pole in his father's No. 04 truck, as well as running twice for HT Motorsports.  After 23 Busch races, he left Rensi to move up to the Nextel level, driving the No. 32 Tide-sponsored Chevrolet for PPI Motorsports. He was given the full-time ride for 2005, but struggled immensely, failing to qualify three times and not finishing any higher than 11th. After driving two events in equipment leased from Front Row Motorsports, Hamilton was let go from PPI at the end of the season.

Without a full-time ride, Hamilton moved to the Truck Series, leasing equipment from the No. 08 team owned by Green Light Racing, and running with Corky's Ribs and BBQ sponsorship. After three races, it was announced that his father had been diagnosed with head and neck cancer, and Hamilton was deemed his replacement in the No. 18 Fastenal-sponsored Dodge. He won the pole in his first race in the truck, but only mustered a 16th-place finish in points, as well as dealing with conflicts within the family-run organization. His attempt to run the 2006 Allstate 400 at the Brickyard at the Cup level also failed.

Following his father's death on January 7, 2007, Hamilton was expected to take over ownership of the team; however, he was not part of the management named by the team's backers the following month. The team eventually closed down in 2008.

2007–present

In 2007, Hamilton returned to the Busch Series and Team Rensi, this time driving the #35 McDonald's Ford. He had three Top 10 finishes and finished sixth in the final standings. After his #35 team folded in 2008, he moved back to the #25 car with Smithfield Foods sponsoring for thirty races. Despite missing two road course events, Hamilton had two Top 10s and finished 15th in points. The team was ready to close near the end of the season when Smithfield's sponsorship ended, but Hamilton funded the team out of his own pocket for the final few races of the season to keep the team going. He also purchased a small portion of the Sadler Brothers team for whom he had begun his career, allowing them to run a limited schedule in the Nationwide and ARCA RE/MAX Series.

Before the 2009 season, Hamilton purchased a small portion of Rensi Motorsports and merged his own operation with the team, forming the new Rensi-Hamilton Racing operation. The #25 team lacked the sponsorship to run Hamilton, and he subsequently drove Randy MacDonald's #81 Dodge for a limited schedule. Hamilton returned to the Truck Series in 2010 for Rick Ware and also ran at Nashville Superspeedway in 2011 with Ware in their #1 truck.

After two years away from major-league racing, Hamilton returned to the track in 2014, signing with Carter 2 Motorsports to drive the team's No. 40 Dodge full-time in the ARCA Racing Series; however before his first race with the team, he was released. In 2015, Hamilton resigned with Carter 2 Motorsports to compete in the 2015 ARCA season.

In 2016 Bobby started Hamilton-Hughes Racing, with none of the three cars entered at Daytona making the field. By the end of May, cars from Hamilton-Hughes Racing were no longer showing up to the track. Most recently Bobby is facing lawsuits from multiple drivers and the team has been evicted from its Russellville, KY shop.

Other ventures
Hamilton replaced his father in 2006 as co-host of "The Driver's Zone" on WGFX 104.5 The Zone in Nashville with Liz Hackett, the remarried widow of Davey Allison, who uses her first husband's surname on the radio show.

Hamilton and wife Stephanie own the Courthouse Cafe in Springfield, Tennessee.

In December 2009, Hamilton purchased Highland Rim Speedway, located in Ridgetop, Tennessee; the track was where he had competed in his first race.  In late 2010, Hamilton was accused of pulling a gun on a competitor at the track during a dispute; Hamilton stated he legally possessed the weapon and believed he was being threatened. No charges were filed in the case. In April 2011, Hamilton and fellow driver Chad Chaffin acquired a two-year contract for the rights to operate Nashville Fairgrounds Speedway in Nashville, Tennessee. In November 2011, however, they were found by the Nashville State Fair to be in default on their obligations, and in April 2012, Hamilton was named in a lawsuit by Nashville for unpaid obligations related to the contract. Hamilton had declared bankruptcy that January, and the Highland Rim track was sold at public auction in February.

Personal life
Hamilton currently resides in Greenbrier, Tennessee, with his wife Stephanie and a daughter.

Motorsports career results

NASCAR
(key) (Bold – Pole position awarded by qualifying time. Italics – Pole position earned by points standings or practice time. * – Most laps led.)

Nextel Cup Series

Nationwide Series

Camping World Truck Series

ARCA Racing Series
(key) (Bold – Pole position awarded by qualifying time. Italics – Pole position earned by points standings or practice time. * – Most laps led.)

 Season still in progress
 Ineligible for series points

Notes and references

External links
 
 

Living people
1978 births
Sportspeople from Nashville, Tennessee
Racing drivers from Nashville, Tennessee
Racing drivers from Tennessee
NASCAR drivers
NASCAR team owners
ARCA Menards Series drivers